Andrew Kuzma is an American politician who represents the 39th District in the Pennsylvania House of Representatives since 2023.

Education

In 2014, Kuzma graduated from Elizabeth Forward High School in Elizabeth, Pennsylvania. In 2018, he attained a B. S. degree in Biological Sciences from the University of Pittsburgh. In 2021, Kuzma obtained his Juris Doctor degree from Duquesne University in Pittsburgh, Pennsylvania.

Political career

Kuzma is an attorney and a former Commissioner from Elizabeth Township, Pennsylvania.

On May 17, 2022, Kuzma defeated incumbent Mike Puskaric in the Republican primary for the Pennsylvania House of Representatives District 39, garnering 58.7% of the votes.

On November 8, 2022, Kuzma defeated Richard Self in the general election for Pennsylvania House of Representatives District 39, garnering 59.4% of the votes.

References

External links
Andrew Kuzma official PA House website

Republican Party members of the Pennsylvania House of Representatives
Living people
Year of birth missing (living people)